The Speers Railroad Bridge, also called the Belle Vernon Railroad Bridge, carries the Wheeling and Lake Erie Railway across the Monongahela River from Speers east to North Belle Vernon in the state of Pennsylvania. The structure was originally designed by the Pittsburgh and West Virginia Railroad  using a K-truss style that is rarely used outside of the Great Plains. The high-level span passes feature several smaller approach segments on the river's eastern bank due to the width of the valley.

See also
List of crossings of the Monongahela River

Bridges over the Monongahela River
Bridges in Washington County, Pennsylvania
Bridges in Westmoreland County, Pennsylvania
Railroad bridges in Pennsylvania
Truss bridges in the United States
Metal bridges in the United States